On 25 June 2021, a mass stabbing occurred in Würzburg, Germany. The attacker killed three civilians and wounded seven others. Minutes later, the police shot the suspect and arrested him.

Attack

At about 17:00 local time, a barefoot man entered a Woolworth shop in Barbarossaplatz in central Würzburg, Bavaria, Germany. He asked the shop assistant in which part of the store the knives were displayed. There, he grabbed a large knife from the kitchen section, wounding the shop assistant. Then he started a stabbing spree, killing three customers around the shop and wounding three more. The attacker then went out of the shop, and knifed more civilians in a street and outside a bank, wounding three people. An Iranian Kurdish asylum seeker, a German soldier and a waiter confronted him defending themselves with objects, some of which were thrown at the attacker. Responding police officers then cornered the suspect in Oberthürstraße, opened fire against the knifeman, wounding him in the thigh and arresting him.

Victims

Three people were killed in the attack and seven more were wounded. The deceased were all women, and were all killed in the first stabbing at the shop. They were identified as an 82-year-old, who was killed while defending a child whom the attacker tried to stab; a 49-year-old Brazilian who moved to Germany in early 2021 and was killed while defending her child; and a 24-year-old who was killed while buying a dress at the shop for her friend's wedding. Of the seven wounded, four were women, one a female child, one a male teenager and the other a female teenager; two were in critical conditions.

Suspect
The suspect was identified as a 24-year-old man of Somalian nationality named Abdirahman Jibril A. Born in Mogadishu, he arrived in Italy as an asylum seeker in early 2015 and moved to Germany in May 2015. He lived in Saxony until 2019 as a regular resident, until he was moved to a refuge for homeless people in September 2019 in Würzburg. Months earlier, he had drawn the attention of authorities due to violent altercations, and had been forced into a psychiatric hospital a month before the attack, as he stopped a random car in the street and sat in it.

However, he was discharged a day later as no traces of mental illness were found. His last violent incident before the mass stabbing was in January 2021, when he threatened an asylum centre's staff member and other asylum seekers with a knife, while his first one in Germany was in 2015 when he wounded a migrant during a fight. He was not however charged with a crime.

Months prior, another Somali asylum seeker denounced Jibril A. to the German authorities, saying that he was "an al-Shabaab member, who killed civilians, journalist and police officers in Somalia". After this claim, an investigation was opened which couldn't confirm the allegation.

There is no evidence of an accomplice, and the perpetrator appears to have operated alone.

On 22 April 2022, Jibril A. was charged with murder, attempted murder and assault. The defence attorney said Jibril A. was going through a stage of psychosis and was convinced to perform the stabbing through auditory hallucination.

Motive
The motive for the attack has not been officially confirmed, however police suspect Islamic extremism. The Woolworth's store detective, some police officers and a number of witnesses reported hearing the attacker shout ʾAllāhu ʾakbar while committing the attack, and after the arrest he said that the attack was 'his jihad'.

A police spokesman said that, while the attacker had a criminal record, none of his previous offences were related to terrorism. Police are also investigating if his release from psychiatric care was premature; however the suspect has not been diagnosed with a mental disorder. Investigators who checked his room for more evidence have not found any Islamic State of Iraq and the Levant's material or religious extremist slogans.

On 29 June, the Munich Prosecutor's office, in a joint statement with the Bavarian police stated that an Islamic motive was 'likely'.

Aftermath
Memorial services were held in Würzburg. The citizens who attempted to disarm the attacker were celebrated in the press as heroes. 
There have been calls for one of them—a Kurdish asylum seeker—to be given German citizenship.

See also
Würzburg train attack

References

2020s crimes in Germany
2020s in Bavaria
Crime in Bavaria
2021 stabbing
June 2021 crimes in Europe
June 2021 events in Germany
Mass stabbings in Germany
Stabbing attacks in 2021